Elachista spiculifera is a moth in the family Elachistidae. It was described by Edward Meyrick in 1922. It is found in India.

The wingspan is about 7.9 mm. The forewings are pale, greyish brown, weakly mottled by dark brown tipped scales. The dark brown scales beyond the middle of the wing form two irregular spots near the costal and tornal margins. The same scales are found in the apical part, where they form a small
irregular spot. The hindwings are dark brown.

References

Moths described in 1922
spiculifera
Moths of Asia